Faifne an Filí, Ollamh of Leinster, died 958.

Faifne was an Irish poet who was regarded as the leading poet of the kingdom of Leinster in Ireland, upon his death in 958. He died the same year as Finshneachta Ua Cuill, a poet from the neighboring kingdom of Munster.

Annalistic references

 M958.10. Faifne the Poet, chief poet of Leinster, died.

See also

 Aedh Ua Raithnen, poet, died c. 954.
 Eochaidh Ua Floinn

External links
 http://www.ucc.ie/celt/published/T100005B/index.html

Medieval Irish poets
10th-century Irish writers
10th-century Irish poets
958 deaths
Irish male poets